The 2017 Trofeo Angelo Caffi was the second edition of the Trofeo Angelo Caffi run at the 2017 Bologna Motor Show. The event featured cars and teams from the NASCAR Whelen Euro Series duelling at a temporary racetrack. The event was won by Lorenzo Marcucci.

Entry List

Race

References

NASCAR Whelen Euro Series
Trofeo Angelo Caffi